Jeff Hiller is an American actor and comedian. He is best known for his portrayal of Joel on Somebody Somewhere. He is also known for his role as Mr. Whitely in American Horror Story: NYC.

Life and career
Hiller graduated from Texas Lutheran University in 1998.

Hiller started performing improv comedy with the Upright Citizens Brigade Theatre in 2001 where he was part of the improv teams People People, The Scam, Creep, Rumpleteaser and Police Chief Rumble.

Hiller has appeared in various television series, including Guiding Light, Ugly Betty, 30 Rock, Law & Order: Criminal Intent, Psych, Unbreakable Kimmy Schmidt and Community. Hiller appeared in the films Morning Glory and Ghost Town. Hiller was well-received for his performance as John Quincy Adams in the hit rock musical Bloody Bloody Andrew Jackson. In 2018, Hiller replaced Drew Droege's solo show Bright Colors and Bold Patterns off-Broadway and it was directed by Michael Urie.

Filmography

Films

Television

Personal life
Hiller is gay, and was founder of the all-gay improv troupe Neely O'Hara. Hiller is married.

References

External links 

Jeff Hiller's personal website

Living people
American male film actors
American male television actors
American gay actors
Gay comedians
Male actors from San Antonio
Place of birth missing (living people)
Upright Citizens Brigade Theater performers
Year of birth missing (living people)
American LGBT comedians